Frédéric-Désiré Hillemacher (23 June 1811 – 28 October 1886) was a Belgian engraver also active in France, most notable for his etchings.

Life
He was born in Brussels, the brother of the painter Eugène-Ernest Hillemacher. Aged thirteen he entered the Compagnie des quatre canaux (a canal company of which his father Guillaume Hillemacher was director) and remained in it for sixty years, only producing engravings or music in his free time. Roger Portalis as a very "moliériste" amateur in his artistic choices and themes "An amiable and modest man, he lived with fourfold passion - his home, etching, Molière and his violin". He died in the 2nd arrondissement of Paris in 1886.

Sources
 
 
 
 

French people of Belgian descent
19th-century French engravers
19th-century French male artists
Belgian engravers
Belgian violinists
19th-century French male violinists
Artists from Brussels
1811 births
1886 deaths